Mabelle Prior (born March 17, 1976) is a Swiss Ghanaian/Togolese former broadcast journalist and producer of women's and children's programmes in the 1990s on Ghana Broadcasting Corporation. She is popularly known as 'Ghana's Queen of the Airwaves'.

Professional experience 
Mabelle worked as reporter at Volta Regional Branch of the Ghana Broadcasting Corporation from 1996 to 2000. She relocated to Switzerland where she continued to work in journalism for a while before becoming first young black lady on the Federatif Committee of Migration and the first young black lady in the Federatif Committee of Women. She has also worked on BIEL International Fashion projects, a platform for promoting multicultural inter-nationality in Biel and Switzerland
Mabelle is presently the editorial director of Swiss Glamour Celebrities magazine.

Languages
Mabelle speaks six languages: Ewe, Twi, Mina, French, English and German.

Association Swiss Most Beautiful-ASMB
Mabelle is the president and founder of Association Swiss Most Beautiful. Established in 2014, ASMB organizes an annual Miss Swiss Most Beautiful pageant. The event aims to promote diversity in women's beauty.

Award and Honor

 Switzerland Excellence Award for distinguished leadership and achievement in youth development & promotion of diversity in women's beauty at Palais Des Congrès In Biel on October 29, 2016, during the 3rd Election of Miss Swiss Most Beautiful.
 Certificate Of Merit In recognition of distinguished contributions to Women development on November 26, 2016, in Bern at the Nigerian Business Forum in Switzerland.

References

1976 births
Living people
Ghanaian broadcasters
Ghanaian emigrants to Switzerland
Ghanaian journalists